The Antiguan Barbudan ambassador in Washington, D. C. is the official representative of the Government in St. John's, Antigua and Barbuda to the Government of the United States and Permanent Representative to the Organization of American States.

List of representatives

Antigua and Barbuda–United States relations

References 

 
United States
Antigua and Barbuda